Lee Chang-ha (born 1 July 1977) is a South Korean backstroke swimmer. She competed at the 1992 Summer Olympics and the 1996 Summer Olympics.

References

External links
 

1977 births
Living people
South Korean female backstroke swimmers
Olympic swimmers of South Korea
Swimmers at the 1992 Summer Olympics
Swimmers at the 1996 Summer Olympics
Place of birth missing (living people)
Asian Games medalists in swimming
Asian Games bronze medalists for South Korea
Swimmers at the 1990 Asian Games
Swimmers at the 1994 Asian Games
Medalists at the 1990 Asian Games
20th-century South Korean women